Michel de Sèvre or de Seurre (active 1539–1593) was a member of the Knights Hospitaller, a French courtier and diplomat, and Grand Master of the Order of Saint Lazarus from 1564 to 1578 and from 1586 to 1593.

Early life

Michel de Sèvre was born in Lumigny-en-Brie, the son of Antoine de Sèvre, lord of Ville-du-Bois in the parish of Lumigny, and of Louise de Verdelot, daughter of Georges de Verdelot, lord of Prèz, and Catherine de Sailly, lady of Mersan.

On June 11, 1539, he entered the Knights Hospitaller in the Grand Priory of France.

Career

In 1560, de Sèvre was Ordinary Gentleman of the King's Chamber, King's Chamberlain, Counselor in his Privy Council and captain of fifty men-at-arms. That year he was sent to the court of Queen Elizabeth I of England as ambassador of King Francis II of France, to negotiate the withdrawal of French and English forces from Scotland. He was, at the time, a royal chamberlain, privy councillor, and captain of a company of men at arms. He continued in office as ambassador until 1562, when he was recalled by King Charles IX of France.

In 1564 he was appointed Grand Master of the Order of Saint Lazarus, serving in that capacity until 1578, and then again from 1586 to 1593.

Seigneur de Sèvre was known for his cynical and caustic wit. In 1584 he was physically assaulted in the council chamber by King Henry III of France, for a perceived insult.

References

Bibliography
 Sèvre, Michel de. A Knight of Malta at the Court of Elizabeth I: The Correspondence of Michel de Seure, French Ambassador, 1560-1561. Camden Fifth Series, v. 45. Cambridge: Cambridge University Press for the Royal Historical Society, 2014.

16th-century French people
People of the Tudor period
Knights Hospitaller
Ambassadors of France to England
16th-century French diplomats
Recipients of the Order of Saint Lazarus
Grand Masters of the Order of Saint Lazarus